The Place Kléber (Kleberplatz in German) is the central square of Strasbourg, France.

Place Kleber, the largest square at the center of the city of Strasbourg in the heart of the city's commercial area, was named after French revolutionary general Jean-Baptiste Kléber, born in Strasbourg in 1753. In the square is a statue of Kléber, under which is a vault containing his remains. On the north side of the square is the Aubette (Orderly Room), built by Blondel in 1765-1772.

Located in Strasbourg's historic center (the Grande Île ("Large Island")) the area was classified a World Heritage Site by UNESCO in 1988, the first time such an honor was placed on an entire city center.

History 

On 24 June 1840 the square was finally renamed for the French general Jean-Baptiste Kléber, also going by 'Kléberplatz' after German annexation.

During German occupation in 1940-1944, the place was renamed after Karl Roos, a local ethnically German politician executed by French authorities in 1940 on the charges of espionage for Germany.

The Aubette 
The Aubette (building) was built in 1765-1772 by Jacques François Blondel, architect to king Louis XV of France.

In 2006, after a long and careful restoration, the inner decoration of the Aubette, made in the 1920s by Hans Arp, Theo van Doesburg, and Sophie Taeuber-Arp and destroyed in the 1930s, was made accessible to the public again. The work of the three artists had been called "the Sistine Chapel of abstract art".

The statue of Kléber 
After his assassination in 1800 in Cairo, the body of Jean-Baptiste Kléber, general during the French Revolutionary Wars born in Strasbourg in 1753, was repatriated to France. Napoleon, fearing that his tomb would become a symbol to Republicanism, ordered it to stay at the Château d'If, on an island near Marseille. It stayed there for 18 years until Louis XVIII granted him a burial place in his hometown in Strasbourg. He was buried on 15 December 1838 below his statue located in the middle of Place Kléber.  His heart is in an urn in the caveau of the Governors beneath the altar of the St. John Chapel in Les Invalides, Paris.

The statue, designed by Philippe Grass, was finally completed in 1838.

The Christmas tree
Traditionally, a huge fir tree (30 m) coming from the Vosges mountains is erected every year on the south west of the Place Kléber and inhabitants deposited gifts for the poor. During the Marché de Noël (Christmas market), the booths of 50 charitable associations make the Village du Partage (village for sharing).

See also 
Christkindelsmärik, Strasbourg

References

External links 

Place Kléber on photo-alsace.com

Buildings and structures in Strasbourg
Strasbourg
Tourist attractions in Strasbourg